Vasili Sergeyevich Kulkov (11 June 1966 – 10 October 2020) was a Russian footballer. 

Either a central defender or defensive midfielder, he was best known for his spells at Spartak Moscow and Benfica. Having retired as a player, he continued his work in football as an assistant in various coaching and managerial crews.

Diagnosed with brain cancer in 2019, he died on 10 October 2020, aged 54, from COVID-19.

Club career
Kulkov was born in Moscow, Soviet Union. From 1984 until the end of his career he played for a host of clubs in Russia, coming to prominence most notably with hometown's FC Spartak Moscow, from where he left in 1991 for a Portuguese league stint with S.L. Benfica (where he played with countrymen Aleksandr Mostovoi and Sergei Yuran). At Benfica, Kulkov scored two great goals in the 1994 Cup Winners Cup game in Leverkusen to pull Benfica into semi finals.

In the 1994–95 season, both Kulkov and Yuran joined FC Porto, being very important figures in the league's conquest. Aged 29, the former returned to Spartak, only to move shortly after to Millwall in the English second division, where he failed to adjust immensely, appearing very rarely in a six-month loan.

After two years with FC Zenit Saint Petersburg and one at FC Krylia Sovetov Samara, Kulkov returned to Portugal, joining F.C. Alverca – Benfica's feeder club but also in the top flight. He closed out his career with amateurs FC Shatura, aged 35.

Kulkov then had some spells in coaching, notably assisting countryman Anatoliy Byshovets at C.S. Marítimo in 2003. Six years later he moved to Spartak Moscow's reserves, in the same capacity.

International career
Kulkov made his debut for the Soviet Union on 26 April 1989, in a 1990 FIFA World Cup qualifier against East Germany.  Despite playing regularly for the national team for several years, he did not participate in any major tournament: in 1990, he was not selected for the final stages in Italy, and missed UEFA Euro 1992 (with CIS) and 1996 due to injury.

Before the 1994 FIFA World Cup, several Russia players, including Kulkov, signed a letter demanding that team manager Pavel Sadyrin resign. The coach did not and the player refused to participate.

Honours
Spartak Moscow
Soviet Top League: 1989
Russian Top League: 1997

Benfica
Primeira Liga: 1993–94
Taça de Portugal: 1992–93

Porto
Primeira Liga: 1994–95

References

External links
RussiaTeam profile 

1966 births
2020 deaths
Deaths from brain tumor
Footballers from Moscow
Soviet footballers
Russian footballers
Association football defenders
Association football midfielders
Association football utility players
Soviet Top League players
Russian Premier League players
FC Asmaral Moscow players
FC Spartak Vladikavkaz players
FC Spartak Moscow players
FC Zenit Saint Petersburg players
PFC Krylia Sovetov Samara players
Primeira Liga players
S.L. Benfica footballers
FC Porto players
F.C. Alverca players
English Football League players
Millwall F.C. players
Soviet Union international footballers
Russia international footballers
Dual internationalists (football)
Soviet expatriate footballers
Russian expatriate footballers
Expatriate footballers in Portugal
Expatriate footballers in England
Russian expatriate sportspeople in Portugal
Russian football managers
FC Dynamo Moscow reserves players
Deaths from the COVID-19 pandemic in Russia